Oussama Amar (born August 23, 2003) is a professional footballer who plays as a forward for UAE Pro League club Al Wasl. Born in France, he represents the Algeria U20 national team at international level.

Career
In January 2022, Amar signed with Valencia.

References

External links
 

Living people
2003 births
French people of Algerian descent
Algerian footballers
Association football forwards
Algeria youth international footballers
Al-Wasl F.C. players
Valencia CF Mestalla footballers
UAE Pro League players
Olympique Lyonnais players
Montpellier HSC players
Algerian expatriate footballers
Algerian expatriate sportspeople in the United Arab Emirates
Expatriate footballers in the United Arab Emirates
Algerian expatriate sportspeople in Spain
Expatriate footballers in Spain